Krajná Poľana is a village and municipality in Svidník District in the Prešov Region of north-eastern Slovakia.

History
The village is first mentioned in historical records in 1618, and it is the oldest village in the region. The village was originally named Hunkovska Polana. From the late 18th Century all the way until the First World War the village was largely inhabited by Polish-speaking settlers from Barwinek, Tylawa and other villages located only a few miles to the north. Intermarriage between Poles and Slovaks was common. This ethnic mixing was made easier by the First Partition of Poland, as a result of which the Polish-Habsburg border on the Carpathian ridge disappeared.

Geography
The municipality lies at an altitude of 333 metres and covers an area of 2.943 km2. It has a population of about 214 people. Next to way is a water dam on Ladomirka river.

Genealogical resources
The records for genealogical research are available at the state archive "Statny Archiv in Presov, Slovakia"
 Greek Catholic church records (births/marriages/deaths): 1823–1922 (parish B)

See also
 List of municipalities and towns in Slovakia

References

External links
 
 
Statistics
Surnames of living people in Krajna Polana

Villages and municipalities in Svidník District
Šariš